SH 863 may refer to:
Clocortolone pivalate, a synthetic glucocorticoid
State highway 863, a list of highways numbered 863